Brevik is a town in Telemark, Norway, with an estimated population of 2,700. Brevik was established as a municipality 1 January 1838 (see formannskapsdistrikt), but was merged with Porsgrunn on 1 January 1964. Brevik is regarded as one of the best preserved towns from the sailing ship era. The town is located on the far end of Eidanger peninsula (Eidangerhalvøya), and was a former export centre for ice and timber. The last shipment of wood to the United Kingdom was around 1960.

Brevik is Cort Adeler's birth town.

Etymology 
The Old Norse form of the name may have been *Breiðvík, where the first element is breiðr 'broad' and the last is vík f 'inlet'.

Important milestones in the development of Brevik 
 Railway track in 1895, Brevikbanen, part of Vestfoldbanen
 Post office in 1689
 Pharmacy in 1846
 Town hall in 1761, built by Jørgen Christie

Notable residents
Erik Hesselberg — crewmember of the Kon-Tiki expedition

External links 
 Brevik's Norwegian homepage 
 Brevik sailing-club
 Norcem

Cities and towns in Norway
Port cities and towns in Norway
Populated places in Vestfold og Telemark
Former municipalities of Norway
Populated places in Porsgrunn